The 2012 FBD Insurance League was an inter-county and colleges Gaelic football competition in the province of Connacht. As well as the five county teams and London, three colleges' teams competed: Institute of Technology, Sligo, NUI Galway and Galway-Mayo Institute of Technology (GMIT). Leitrim won for the second year in a row.

Format
The teams are drawn into two groups of 4 and 5 teams. Each team plays the other teams in its group once, earning 2 points for a win and 1 for a draw. The two group winners play in the final. The winners were supposed to play a further game against New York, but this game was never played.

Results

Final

References

FBD Insurance League
FBD Insurance League